Khedrup Gyatso (1 November 1838 – 31 January 1856) was the 11th Dalai Lama of Tibet.

He was recognised as the Eleventh Dalai Lama in 1840, having come from the same village as Kelzang Gyatso, the seventh Dalai Lama, had in 1708. In 1841, Palden Tenpai Nyima, 7th Panchen Lama, gave him the pre-novice ordination, cut his hair and gave him the name Khedrup Gyatso.

In 1842, he was enthroned in the Potala Palace and, in 1849, at the age of eleven, he took the novice vows of monkhood from Palden Tenpai Nyima, 7th Panchen Lama

He was enthroned on 25 May 1842 and assumed full power on the request of his government on 1 March 1855. However, he died less than one year later, thus becoming the third successive Dalai Lama who died at too young an age to consolidate his power.

"During the period of the short-lived Dalai Lamas—from the Ninth to the Twelfth incarnations—the Panchen was the lama of the hour, filling the void left by the four Dalai Lamas who died in their youth."

He wrote a book of stanzas, Story of the Monkeys and Birds. It is an allegory of the war at the end of the 18th century between the Tibetans and the Gurkhas ('birds' and 'monkeys' respectively).

During the life of Khedrup Gyatso, wars over Ladakh weakened the lamas' power over the Tibetan Plateau and the First and Second Opium Wars as well as the Taiping Rebellion simultaneously weakened Qing Empire's influence on Tibet. In the last years of his reign the Nepalese invaded Tibet, but were defeated in the Nepalese-Tibetan War (1855–1856).

He died suddenly in the Potala Palace, Lhasa, Tibet, on 31 January 1856.

References

Further reading
Mullin, Glenn H. (2001). The Fourteen Dalai Lamas: A Sacred Legacy of Reincarnation, pp. 361–367. Clear Light Publishers. Santa Fe, New Mexico. .

1838 births
1856 deaths
A1
Child monarchs from Asia
19th-century Tibetan people